This is an incomplete list of ghost towns in Mississippi.

 Arcadia
 Arnot
 Artonish
 Baleshed
 Bankston
 Beatties Bluff
 Ben Lomond
 Brewton
 Briers
 Bruinsburg
 Brunswick
 Camargo
 Colony Town
 Commerce
 Concordia
 Cotton Gin Port
 Delta
 Dogtown
 Duncansby
 Eutaw
 Fort Adams
 Gainesville
 Gin
 Grand Gulf
 Gum Ridge
 Holcut
 Holmesville
 Hopewell
 Inwood
 Kienstra
 Logtown
 Middleton
 Midway
 Napoleon
 Old Town
 Palo Alto
 Peyton
 Pink
 Port Royal
 Prentiss
 Princeton
 Rocky Springs
 Rodney
 Sand Hill
 Selsertown
 Tocowa
 Trotter Landing
 Uniontown
 Victoria (Bolivar County)
 Westville
 Woolworth
 Yale
 Zama

Notes and references

 
Mississippi
Ghost towns